Events from the year 1811 in Russia

Incumbents
 Monarch – Alexander I

Events

 
 
  
  
 Golovnin Incident
 Kuban Cossack Choir

Births

Deaths

References

1811 in Russia
Years of the 19th century in the Russian Empire